"Almost Cut My Hair" is a song by Crosby, Stills, Nash & Young, originally released on the band's 1970 album Déjà Vu. It was recorded at Wally Heider Studios on January 9, 1970.

Background 
The song describes a real-life dilemma faced by many hippies: whether to cut one's hair to a more practical length, or leave it long as a symbol of rebellion. It was written by David Crosby, and features solo vocals by Crosby, with the rest of the band joining in on instruments rather than on vocal harmony, as in many of their other songs. Unlike most of the tracks on Déja Vu, the quartet and their studio musicians, Dallas Taylor (drums) and Greg Reeves (bass), all recorded it at the same place and time. It was one of only two songs from the album that Neil Young joined in on, despite not writing.

Although the notion of long hair as a "freak flag" appeared earlier, notably in a 1967 Jimi Hendrix song "If 6 Was 9", Crosby's song has been credited with popularizing the idea of long hair as a deliberate and visible symbol of the wearer's affiliation with the counterculture, and opposition to establishment values. The song also evokes the singer's "paranoia" at seeing the police;
James Perone writes that, "more than any other song of the entire era", it "captures the extent to which the divisiveness in American society ... had boiled over into violence and terror".

It became one of Crosby's signature songs, and "probably his most important political song".
Crosby himself stated "It was the most juvenile set of lyrics I've ever written ... but it has a certain emotional impact, there's no question about that."

Personnel
David Crosby – lead vocals, rhythm guitar
Stephen Stills – guitars
Graham Nash – organ
Neil Young – guitars

Additional musicians 
Greg Reeves – bass
Dallas Taylor – drums, percussion

References

Crosby, Stills, Nash & Young songs
1970 singles
Songs written by David Crosby
1970 songs